Augusta Heritage Center in Elkins, West Virginia, United States, is a non-profit organization which fosters the scholarly study and practice of traditional arts in music, dance, craft, and folklore.

The program started in 1973 as a summer program named "Augusta Heritage Arts Workshops" that focused on Appalachian heritage and traditions. In 1981, Davis & Elkins College became the sponsor of the program, and renamed the program to Augusta Heritage Center. It has become known nationally and internationally for its activities relating to traditional folklife and folk arts of many regions and cultures. It conducts intensive week-long workshops for participants and holds public concerts, dances, and festivals. It has a full-time staff, plus volunteers, seasonal staff, and work-study students. The workshops and festivals are conducted by master artists, musicians, dancers, and craftspeople.

References

Tourist attractions in Randolph County, West Virginia
Education in Randolph County, West Virginia
West Virginia folklore